Larry Chalmers (July 21, 1944 – May 2, 2013) was a Canadian politician in the province of British Columbia. He served as Member of the Legislative Assembly for Okanagan South from 1986 to 1991 and as Minister of Agriculture, Fisheries and Food for the British Columbia Social Credit Party under Premier Rita Johnston.

In 1986, Chalmers was elected alongside Cliff Serwa in the two-member riding of Okanagan South.

In 1987, he served as a member of the legislative Special Committee to Appoint an Auditor General for the province of British Columbia.

His provincial political career ended in the 1991 British Columbia general election when he was defeated by newcomer Judi Tyabji in the newly created riding of Okanagan East.

As a realtor, Chalmers served as former Director at British Columbia Real Estate Association, former President of the Okanagan Mainland Real Estate Board, former President and Director at Kelowna Chamber of Commerce, and chair of the Economic Development Commission.

Election results 

|-

|-

|-

|- bgcolor="white"
!align="right" colspan=3|Total Valid Votes
!align="right"| 22,299
!align="right"|100.00
|- bgcolor="white"
|- bgcolor="white"
!align="right" colspan=3|Total rejected ballots
!align="right"|349
!align="right"|
|}

References 

1944 births
2013 deaths
British Columbia Social Credit Party MLAs
Businesspeople from British Columbia
Businesspeople from Manitoba
Canadian real estate agents
Members of the Executive Council of British Columbia
People from Kelowna
People from Westman Region, Manitoba
20th-century Canadian legislators